In applied mathematics, a trapping region of a dynamical system is a region such that every trajectory that starts within the trapping region will move to the region's interior and remain there as the system evolves.

References

Dynamical systems
Applied mathematics
Systems theory